Reşat Erceş (born 5 June 1918, date of death unknown) was a Turkish alpine skier. He competed in the men's combined event at the 1936 Winter Olympics. He also participated in the 4 × 10 kilometer relay race, but the Turkish relay team (consisting of Reşat Erceş, Sadri Erkılıç, Mehmut Şevket Karman, Cemal Tigin) did not finish. He was the youngest Turkish athlete at these Games. He was the youngest Turkish athlete at these Games.

References

External links
 

1918 births
Year of death missing
Turkish male alpine skiers
Turkish male cross-country skiers
Olympic alpine skiers of Turkey
Olympic cross-country skiers of Turkey
Alpine skiers at the 1936 Winter Olympics
Cross-country skiers at the 1936 Winter Olympics
Place of birth missing
20th-century Turkish people